This is a list of all the United States Supreme Court cases from volume 338 of the United States Reports:

External links

1949 in United States case law
1950 in United States case law